Los Cenzontles (Nahuatl for The Mockingbirds) is a Mexican-American group, cultural arts academy, and media production studio, that promotes Mexican roots music through research, performance, education, musical recordings and videos. They are based in the working-class city of San Pablo, California where they form the core of Los Cenzontles Cultural Arts Academy, where the members of the group were trained. Los Cenzontles have revived and promoted little known styles of Mexican regional music since 1989. The group has collaborated with numerous artists that include David Hidalgo, Linda Ronstadt,  Los Lobos, Ry Cooder, Taj Mahal, Jackson Browne, The Chieftains and Flaco Jimenez, among others. Los Cenzontles has produced 30 tradition-based and cross cultural albums, 4 documentaries, and hundreds of video shorts available on their YouTube channel.

History
Los Cenzontles was begun in 1989 by Eugene Rodriguez as part of a California Arts Council artist residency.  The goal of the Los Cenzontles Project was to create a place for area youth to learn traditional Mexican music and dance. When students' training advanced, the original touring group of Los Cenzontles was formed to showcase Mexican folk music and focus on educational outreach. That same year Eugene met Grupo Mono Blanco, leaders in the fandango movement in Veracruz, Mexico. He established a long-term international collaboration designed to bridge the Jarocho and Chicano communities. Chicano teen members of Los Cenzontles traveled to rural Veracruz in 1991, 93 and 98. Rodriguez established the Fandango Project with support from the US Mexico Fund for Culture to create a residency to promote increased cultural participation in California for Gilberto Gutierrez, of Mono Blanco, and photographer Silvia Gonzalez de Leon. 

In 1994, three major events provoked Rodriguez to incorporate Los Cenzontles as a non-profit organization:

 That year the recording of Papa's Dream, produced by Eugene for Los Lobos, Lalo Guerrero and members of Los Cenzontles was released. The recording was subsequently nominated for a Grammy for Best Musical Album for Children. 
 Eugene Rodriguez incorporated Los Cenzontles Mexican Arts Center as a non-profit, responding to spiraling social problems among local youth. 
 That same year, 15-year-old Cecilia Rios, San Pablo resident and close friend of many of the Center's students, was brutally raped and murdered. In response to the tragic loss, the members of Los Cenzontles composed their first original work, El Corrido de Cecilia Rios.

In 1995, the group released its first album, Con Su Permiso, Señores. The group has released 23 albums in 21 years and have collaborated with David Hidalgo, Jackson Browne, Taj Mahal, Ry Cooder, The Chieftains, Linda Ronstadt, Lalo Guerrero, Pete Sears, Gregorio Hernández Ríos "El Goyo", Lázaro Ros, Mariachi los Camperos de Nati Cano, Carlos Caro, Shira Kammen, The Estrada Brothers, Saul Hernandez, Bobby Black, Bill Evans (banjo), Julian Gonzalez, Atilano Lopez, Grupo Mono Blanco and Santiago Jimenez, Jr.  Currently, Los Cenzontles tours venues in the United States, Europe, Caribbean and Mexico.  Los Cenzontles has also opened performances for Los Tigres del Norte, Los Lobos and Jaguares. 

In 1997 Los Cenzontles Mexican Arts Center (LCMAC) sponsored the International Youth in the Tradition Festival featuring workshops and performances in Son Jarocho, Conjunto, Mariachi and Banda. The five-day festival featured youth groups from Mexico and California and artists including Lalo Guerrero, Yolanda del Rio, Graciela Beltran, Grupo Mono Blanco and others. The Festival was sponsored by the US Mexico Fund for Culture. 

In 2002 LCMAC received the Coming Up Taller Award from the President's Committee on the Arts and the Humanities. 

With support from the James Irvine Foundation, Los Cenzontles began developing a 3-part documentary series in 2003. The “Cultures of México in California” project is a cultural preservation/awareness project that explores the changing role of roots music and dance in Mexican immigrant and Mexican-American communities in California.  Their first DVD, Pasajero, was released in 2004.  

In 2013, Eugene Rodriguez was awarded a United States Artists Oliver Fellowship. 

In 2016, Los Cenzontles completed a successful 11 day tour to Cuba where they performed numerous concerts and cultural exchanges in various cities that included Havana, Sancti Spiritus, Las Tunas and Santa Clara. The resulting documentary Conexiones: A Cuban Mexican Connection has been broadcast on Public Television on numerous affiliates nationwide and screened at many film festivals. 

In 2017, they collaborated with Jackson Browne on the composition, recording and video of their song The Dreamer about DACA youth. 

In 2018, Los Cenzontles performed with Preservation Hall Jazz Band at the SFJazz Gala that was followed up by an invitation to the group to do a week long residency at Preservation Hall in New Orleans. 

In 2019, 22 members of Los Cenzontles, ages eight to adult, accompanied Linda Ronstadt on a trip to Sonora, Mexico to perform at the birthplace of Linda's grandfather. Jackson Browne also traveled on the trip that was filmed by director James Keach for an upcoming documentary. 

In June 2019, the group performed at the Kennedy Center Millenium stage and Library of Congress in Washington D.C. 

Today, Los Cenzontles continues to perform, research, teach, present and create new work.

Current members 
 Fabiola Trujillo - Voice
 Lucina Rodriguez - Voice, jarana, guitar, percussion, zapateado
 Eugene Rodriguez - Voice, guitars
 Emiliano Rodriguez - Accordion, guitar, bass

Discography 

 Con Su Permiso, Señores, 1995
 You'll Come Flying, 1997
 Amor, Paz y Sinceridad, 1999
 Volando en los Cafetales, 1999
 Hypnotizada, 1999
 De Una Bonita, 2000
 Cancionero, 2000
 Cuatro Maestros, 2001
 Media Vida, 2002
 Plan de la Villa, 2002
 El Pasajero, 2003
 Pocas Palabras, 2003
 Pasajero, A Journey of Time and Memory, 2004
 El Chivo Traditional Mariachi Volume III, 2004
 El Toro Viejo Traditional Mariachi Volume IV, 2006
 Los Senn-sont-less, 2007
 Songs of Wood and Steel, 2008 (with David Hidalgo)
 American Horizon, 2009 (with Taj Mahal and David Hidalgo)
 San Patricio, 2010 (contributing three songs with The Chieftains and Ry Cooder)
 Estado de Verguenza, 2010 (single)
 Raza de Oro, 2010
 Flor de Canela, 10 Anos de Dueto compilation, 2011
 Regeneration, 2012
 Los Cenzontles with David Hidalgo - Puro Jam, 2013
 American Roulette EP, 2014 (with David Hidalgo) 
 Shades of Brown, Zydeco Mexican Connection 2015 (with David Hidalgo & Andre Thierry)
 Alma Campirana, 2015
 Covers, 2016
 Carta Jugada, with Los Texmaniacs and Flaco Jimenez, 2017
 Covers 2, 2018
 Con Mucho Sentimiento, Los Cenzontles Juvenil, 2018
 A La Mar, with Shira Kammen, 2018
 Alma P'urhépecha, with Atilano Lopez Patricio, 2018

DVD and video 
 Pasajero, A Journey of Time and Memory, 2004
 Fandango, Searching for the White Monkey, 2006
 Vivir (To Live), 2008
 Los Cenzontles on YouTube
 Tata's Gift
 Jackson Browne - The Dreamer (Featuring Los Cenzontles)0
 Conexiones: A Cuban Mexican Connection
 Musical Conversations - Los Cenzontles at Preservation Hall

References

External links 
 Los Cenzontles homepage
 Los Cenzontles on YouTube
 Los Cenzontles Mexican Arts Center homepage
  El Corrido de Cecilia Rios, A Film by Kristy Guevara Flannagan
  The Pedagogy of Intangible Heritage: Los Cenzontles and Mexican Folk Music by Maribel Alvarez
  New York Times editorial by Lawrence Downes
  SF Chronicle by Joel Selvin
  New York Times CD review by Jon Pareles
  NPR Morning Edition A Little Factory of Culture
  American Routes Radio
  Herald de Paris
 Santa Cruz Sentinel
 

Musical groups established in 1994
Latin music groups
American world music groups
1994 establishments in California
Arhoolie Records artists